Lake Moraine (also known as Madison Reservoir) is a mesotrophic lake located  northeast of Hamilton, New York. Payne Brook is the lake's outflow that flows into the Chenango River.

Fishing

The fish species in Lake Moraine are largemouth bass, smallmouth bass, chain pickerel, brook trout, rainbow trout, tiger muskie, walleye, black crappie, pumpkinseed sunfish, bluegill, brown trout, redbreast sunfish, rock bass, brown bullhead, golden shiner, white sucker and creek chubsucker. The reservoir is well known for producing large chain pickerel up to 24". 
Lake Moraine is stocked yearly by the NYSDEC with approximately 780 tiger musky. The Lake Moraine Association has started an experimental walleye fingerling stocking in the reservoir in an attempt to reduce the number of panfish. With fewer panfish the number of aquatic invertebrates that feed on Eurasian watermilfoil should increase in the reservoir thus helping to control the watermilfoil naturally.
There is a state owned concrete ramp and carry down boat launch on County Route 87 (East Lake Road), 3 miles south of Madison, New York.

References

Moraine
Moraine
Tourist attractions in Madison County, New York